EudraLex is the collection of rules and regulations governing medicinal products in the European Union.

Volumes
EudraLex consists of 10 volumes:
Concerning Medicinal Products for Human use:
Volume 1 - Pharmaceutical Legislation.
Volume 2 - Notice to Applicants.
Volume 2A deals with procedures for marketing authorisation.
Volume 2B deals with the presentation and content of the application dossier.
Volume 2C deals with Guidelines.
Volume 3 - Guidelines.
Concerning Medicinal Products for human use in clinical trials (investigational medicinal products).
Volume 10 - Clinical trials.
Concerning Veterinary Medicinal Products:
Volume 5 - Pharmaceutical Legislation.
Volume 6 - Notice to Applicants.
Volume 7 - Guidelines.
Volume 8 - Maximum residue limits.
Concerning Medicinal Products for Human and Veterinary use:
Volume 4 - Good Manufacturing Practices.
Volume 9 - Pharmacovigilance.
Miscellaneous:
Guidelines on Good Distribution Practice of Medicinal Products for Human Use (94/C 63/03)

Directives
 Directive 65/65/EEC1, requires prior approval for marketing of proprietary medicinal products
 Directive 75/318/EEC, clarifies requirements of 65/65/EEC1 and requires member states to enforce them
 Directive 75/319/EEC, requires marketing authorization requests to be drawn up only by qualified experts
 Directive 93/41/EEC, establishes the European Agency for the Evaluation of Medicinal Products
 Directive 2001/20/EC, defines rules for the conduct of clinical trials
Directive 2001/83/EC
Directive 2005/28/EC, defines Good Clinical Practice for design and conduct of clinical trials

See also
European Union law
European Union directive
European Commission
Directorate-General
EUR-Lex
Regulation of therapeutic goods
International Conference on Harmonisation of Technical Requirements for Registration of Pharmaceuticals for Human Use
Good clinical practice
European Medicines Agency
EUDRANET
EudraVigilance
Title 21 of the Code of Federal Regulations (USA)
Drug development

References
 Eudralex,The Rules Governing Medicinal Products in the European Union, European Communities Commission. Directorate-General for Industry, Pharmaceuticals and Cosmetics.  
 Vol. 1: Pharmaceutical legislation: medicinal products for human use. 
 Vol. 2: Notice to applicants: medicinal products for human use. 
 Vol. 3: Guidelines: medicinal products for human use. 
 Vol. 4: Good manufacturing practices: medicinal products for human and veterinary use. 
 Vol. 5: Pharmaceutical legislation: veterinary medicinal products. 
 Vol. 6: Notice to applicants: veterinary medical products. 
 Vol. 7. Guidelines: Veterinary medicinal products.   
 Markus Hartmann and Florence Hartmann-Vareilles, The Clinical Trials Directive: How Is It Affecting Europe's Noncommercial Research?, PLoS Clin Trials. 2006 June; 1(2): e13

External links
News on Pharmaceuticals, (European Union) 
EudraLex
EUR-Lex
Review of pharmaceutical legislation (EU DG Enterprise and Industry)
Directorate General Enterprise and Industry (European Commission)

Health and the European Union
European Union law
Pharmaceuticals policy
National agencies for drug regulation

de:Arzneimittelzulassung#Europäische Union